The Greece national football team represented Greece at the FIFA Confederations Cup on one occasion, a sole appearance in 2005. Greece qualified for the 2005 FIFA Confederations Cup as the UEFA representative after winning UEFA Euro 2004.

Record at the FIFA Confederations Cup

2005 FIFA Confederations Cup

Group A

External links

Greece national football team
Countries at the FIFA Confederations Cup